The Gymnastics Federation of Nigeria is the overall governing body of the sports of gymnastics in Nigeria. Established in 1975, the body is affiliated to the International Federation of Gymnastics with the mission of “an all round development of gymnastics in Nigeria and beyond”.

References

External links
 Official website

National members of the African Gymnastics Union
Gymnastics
Gymnastics in Nigeria
1975 establishments in Nigeria